Abdoulaye Diawara (born 26 January 1983) is a French-born Malian professional footballer who plays as a midfielder for SR Colmar.

Career
Born in Paris, Diawara started his career at PSG. He played for Paris FC from 2007 to 2013. In June 2013, he signed for SR Colmar.

Personal life
Abdoulaye is the younger brother of Fousseni and Samba.

References

External links
 

1983 births
Living people
Citizens of Mali through descent
Malian footballers
Footballers from Paris
Mali youth international footballers
French footballers
French sportspeople of Malian descent
Association football midfielders
Sint-Truidense V.V. players
Paris FC players
C.S. Visé players
AS Beauvais Oise players
SR Colmar players
CA Bastia players
SAS Épinal players
Belgian Pro League players
Championnat National players
Championnat National 2 players
Championnat National 3 players
Malian expatriate footballers
French expatriate footballers
Expatriate footballers in Belgium